The cylinder desk is a desk that resembles a Bureau Mazarin or a writing table equipped with small stacked shelves in front of the user's main work surface, and a revolving cylinder part that comes down to hide and lock up the working papers when the desk is not in use. 

Like the rolltop desk, which was invented much later, the cylinder desk usually has a fixed work surface: the paperwork does not have to be stored before the desk is shut. Some designs, however, have the capacity to slide the desk surface out a few inches to expand the available work area.

The cylinder desk is also called "bureau Kaunitz", as it was allegedly introduced in France in the first half of the 18th century by Wenzel Anton von Kaunitz, then the ambassador of the Habsburg Empire to the French court.  Regardless of the authenticity of its origin, the French court adopted this type of desk with great enthusiasm.  

The difficulty of producing wooden cylinder sections which would not warp over the years ensured that such desks were reserved for the rich. A few variants of this form have slats instead of a one-piece cylinder section.

The most famous cylinder desk, and perhaps the most famous desk of all times, is the Bureau du Roi manufactured for the French royalty in the 18th century.

References

Aronson, Joseph. The Encyclopedia of Furniture, 3rd edition. New York: Crown Publishers Inc., 1965. 
Boyce, Charles. Dictionary of Furniture. New York: Facts on File Inc., 1985. .
Brunhammer, Yvonne; Monique de Fayet.  Meubles et ensembles, époque Louis XVI. Paris, Éditions Charles Massin, 1965.  Pages 59, 60, 61, 65.
De Reyniès, Nicole. Le Mobilier Domestique: Vocabulaire Typologique. Paris: Imprimerie Nationale, 1987.
Forrest, Tim and Paul J. Atterbury (consulting editor). The Bulfinch Anatomy of Antique Furniture: An Illustrated Guide to Identifying Period, Detail, and Design. London: Bulfinch Press, 1996. .
Hinckley, F. Lewis. A Directory of Antique Furniture: The Authentic Classification of European and American Designs. New York: Bonanza Books, 1988. .
Oglesby, Catherine. French Provincial Decorative Art. New York: Scribner, 1951. 
Payne, Christopher, ed. Sotheby's Concise Encyclopedia of Furniture. London: Conran Octopus, 1989. . 

See also the list of desk forms and types.

Desks